Keilhaufjellet is a mountain in Sørkapp Land at Spitsbergen, Svalbard. It has a height of 660 m.a.s.l. The mountain is named after Norwegian geologist Baltazar Mathias Keilhau. Keilhaufjellet was the southernmost triangulation point established during the Swedish-Russian Arc-of-Meridian Expedition (from 1899).

References

Mountains of Spitsbergen